Agroha may refer to:

 Agroha (town), a town in Hisar district of Haryana, India
 Agroha Dham, a temple complex dedicated to Agrasena in Agroha
 Agroha Mound, an archaeological site located in Hisar district of Haryana, India